The Conservative Alliance of Zimbabwe (CAZ) was the final incarnation of a party formerly called the Republican Front,  and prior to that it was called the Rhodesian Front. In the immediate post-independence period, the party sought to promote the position of whites in Zimbabwe and did not initially seek support amongst other ethnic groups. Following the abolition of the "white roll" seats in parliament, the CAZ attempted to distance itself from its past and appeal to black voters.

White politics post-independence 
White politics in Zimbabwe immediately after independence were mainly involved in contesting 20 reserved "white roll" seats in the Zimbabwe parliament, although some whites joined ZANU (PF). The RF party remained under the dominance of Ian Smith who insisted on keeping its identity as a white party concentrating on issues of importance to whites. The RF and later CAZ did not contest common roll seats in either 1980 or 1985. The inadequacy of this as a political strategy quickly became apparent. Most of the sitting RF MPs in the 1980 to 85 parliament either became independents or defected to ZANU.

Smith's response to this in the 1985 general election was to mount a campaign against the defectors, and RF (now renamed CAZ) succeeded in winning 15 of the 20 white seats.  The white seats in Parliament were abolished in 1987, although CAZ continued to enjoy limited representation at municipal level. By that time, white-led civic groups such as the CZI (Confederation of Zimbabwe Industry) and CFU (Commercial Farmers Union) were openly supporting ZANU (PF).

1985 - 1992 
Following the abolition of the "white roll" seats in parliament, the CAZ attempted to shed some of its past legacy and broaden its appeal by reaching out to black voters and advertising membership to people of all races.

In July 1992, Ian Smith chaired a meeting of opposition political groups with a view to forming a political front to oppose ZANU (PF). This meeting was attended by representatives of Rhodesian-era parties including CAZ, UANC, ZANU-Ndonga and ZUM. The Forum for Democratic Reform and the Forum Party (incorporating CAZ) emerged from this.

Footnotes

1984 establishments in Zimbabwe
1992 disestablishments in Zimbabwe
Conservative parties in Zimbabwe
Defunct political parties in Zimbabwe
Political parties disestablished in 1992
Political parties established in 1984
Political parties of minorities
Protestant political parties
White nationalism in Zimbabwe
White nationalist parties